Doomer and, by extension,  doomerism are terms which arose primarily on the Internet to describe people who are extremely pessimistic or fatalistic about global problems such as overpopulation, peak oil, climate change, and pollution. Some doomers assert there is a possibility these problems will bring about human extinction. A 2021 study showed that the doomer mindset is common among young people. Alternatives to doomerism include solarpunk.

Malthusians have related Doomerism to Malthusianism, an economic philosophy holding that human resource use will eventually exceed resource availability, leading to societal collapse.

History

Peaknik subculture

The term "doomer" was reported in 2008 as being used in early internet peaknik communities, as on internet forums where members discussed the theorized point in time when oil extraction would stop due to lack of resources, followed by societal collapse. Doomers of the mid-aughts subscribed to various ideas on how to face this impending collapse, including doomsday prepping, as well as more contemporary feelings of resignation and defeat.

Canadian self-identified doomer Paul Chefurka hosted a website where he encouraged his readers to eat lower on the food chain, modify their homes for the apocalypse, and to consider not having children.
Not all "peakniks" subscribed to a fatalist outlook. U.S. Army Ranger Chris Lisle, when writing recommendations on how to survive the societal collapse, suggested that his fellow doomers "adopt a positive attitude," because, as he put it, "Hard times don't last, hard people do."

Internet meme
By 2018, 4chan users had begun creating Wojak caricatures with the -oomer suffix, derived from "boomer", to mock various groups online. One of these caricatures was "Doomers", 20-somethings who had "simply stopped trying".
The meme first appeared on 4chan's /r9k/ board in September 2018.
The image typically depicts the Wojak character in a beanie, smoking a cigarette. "Doomer" themed playlists, featuring this wojak along with slowed down music edits (often involving post-punk or rock) reached popularity on Youtube, especially during the Covid-19 lockdowns. The archetype often embodies nihilism and despair, with a belief in the incipient end of the world to causes ranging from climate apocalypse to peak oil to (more locally) opioid addiction. 
Kaitlyn Tiffany writes in The Atlantic that the doomer meme depicts young men who "are no longer pursuing friendships or relationships, and get no joy from anything because they know that the world is coming to an end." 

A related meme format, "doomer girl", began appearing on 4chan in January 2020, and it soon moved to other online communities, including Reddit, Twitter, and Tumblr, often by women claiming it from its 4chan origins. This format is described by The Atlantic as "a quickly sketched cartoon woman with black hair, black clothes, and sad eyes ringed with red makeup". The doomer girl character often appears in image macros interacting with the original doomer character. The format is often compared to rage comics.

In media
The term "doomer" was popularized in commentary surrounding Jonathan Franzen's 2019 essay in The New Yorker titled "What if We Stopped Pretending?". The piece made an argument against the possibility of averting climatic catastrophe. In addition to popularizing the term among general audiences, Franzen's piece was highly popular among online Doomer communities, including the Facebook groups Near Term Human Extinction Support Group and Abrupt Climate Change.

The BBC describes sustainability professor Jem Bendell's self-published paper Deep Adaptation: A Map for Navigating Climate Tragedy as "the closest thing to a manifesto for a generation of self-described 'climate doomers. As of March 2020, the paper had been downloaded more than a half-million times. In it, Bendell claims there is no chance to avert a near-term breakdown in human civilization, but that people must instead prepare to live with and prepare for the effects of climate change.

Climate scientist Michael E. Mann described Bendell's paper as "pseudo-scientific nonsense", saying Bendell's "doomist framing" was a "dangerous new strain of crypto-denialism" that would "lead us down the very same path of inaction as outright climate change denial".
An essay published on OpenDemocracy argues that the paper is an example of "climate doomism" that "relies heavily on misinterpreted climate science".

Michael Mann has also listed David Wallace Wells's framing of the climate crisis, which he presents in "The Uninhabitable Earth" and The Uninhabitable Earth: Life After Warming, as being among "the prominent doomist narratives."

Uncivilization: The Dark Mountain Manifesto, published in 2009 by Paul Kingsnorth and Dougald Hine to signal the beginning of the artists' group the Dark Mountain Project, critiques the idea of progress. According to The New York Times, critics called Kingsnorth and his sympathizers "doomers", "nihilists", and "crazy collapsitarians".

Kate Knibbs, writing in Wired, described the development of a popular and growing strain of "doomer" climate fiction, in contrast to the typically optimistic undertones of the genre. Amy Brady, a climate fiction columnist for the Chicago Review of Books, says the genre has moved from future scenarios to near-past and present stories.

Statistics 
A 2021 survey of 10,000 people between the ages of 16 to 25 from the UK, Australia, USA, India, Philippines, Nigeria, France, Finland, Portugal and Brazil asked whether participants agreed with the statement "humanity is doomed." 55.7% answered yes, 40.7% answered no, and 3.7% preferred not to state. 45% of participants also indicated that climate anxiety was impacting their day-to-day functioning.

Alternatives 
Alternatives to doomerism include radical hope and solarpunk, which reject the hopeless view of the future. Solarpunk rejects the tropes of doomerist media present in television shows like Black Mirror and The Handmaid's Tale by instead imagining and working toward a sustainable future where climate change, income inequality, and discrimination have been overcome.

See also

Anarcho-primitivism
Apocalypse
Club of Rome
Deindustrialization
Ecological grief
Human overpopulation
Meteorology
Millenarianism
Myth of Progress
Overshoot (population)
Internet culture

Societal collapse
What a Way to Go: Life at the End of Empire
 Cornucopian

References

External links
 Doomsters(sic) – A journal article discussing peak oil and "Doomsters"

Survivalism
Nihilism
Internet memes introduced in 2018